Elizabeth Warden (born February 3, 1978) is a Canadian former competitive swimmer who specialized in backstroke and individual medley events.  She won a silver medal in the 400-metre individual medley at the 1998 Commonwealth Games in Kuala Lumpur, Malaysia, with a time of 4:47.69.  Warden was also a member of the swimming team, and a graduate of the University of Toronto.

Warden qualified for three swimming events at the 2004 Summer Olympics in Athens, by attaining an A-standard entry time of 2:13.60 in the 200-metre individual medley from the Canadian national championships in Victoria, British Columbia.  On the first day of the competition, Warden placed second behind Hungary's Éva Risztov in the third heat of the women's 400-metre individual medley, with a time of 4:46.27.  In the 200-metre individual medley, Warden failed to qualify for the final, as she finished fifteenth overall in the semifinal run, in a second slowest time of 2:17.32.  In her third event, 200-metre backstroke, Warden missed two places in the semifinals, by 0.76 of a second behind Croatia's Sanja Jovanović, on the morning's preliminary heats with a time of 2:15.77.

References

External links
Profile – Canadian Olympic Team
Profile – Canoe.ca

1978 births
Living people
Canadian female backstroke swimmers
Canadian female medley swimmers
Commonwealth Games silver medallists for Canada
Olympic swimmers of Canada
Swimmers from Toronto
Sportspeople from Scarborough, Toronto
Swimmers at the 1998 Commonwealth Games
Swimmers at the 1999 Pan American Games
Swimmers at the 2004 Summer Olympics
Commonwealth Games medallists in swimming
Universiade medalists in swimming
Universiade bronze medalists for Canada
Medalists at the 1999 Summer Universiade
Pan American Games competitors for Canada
Medallists at the 1998 Commonwealth Games